Chambon-sur-Voueize (literally Chambon on Voueize) is a commune in the Creuse department in the Nouvelle-Aquitaine region in central France.

Geography

Population

Sights
 The abbey church of St. Valerie, dating from the eleventh century.
 The château de Marsat.
 The ruined castle at Barbe-Bleu.
 A medieval bridge over the Voueize.

See also
Communes of the Creuse department

References

External links

 Tourism Office

Communes of Creuse